"Corazon Enamorado" is a song by Juan Luis Guerra, released on April 26, 2019 as the second single from his fourteenth studio album Literal.

Charts

References 

2019 singles
Juan Luis Guerra songs
2019 songs
Songs written by Juan Luis Guerra